Saotomea delicata, common name : the delicate volute,  is a species of sea snail, a marine gastropod mollusk in the family Volutidae, the volutes.

Description
The shell size varies between 25 mm and 55 mm

Distribution
This species is distributed in the seas along Japan.

References

 Bail, P & Poppe, G. T. 2001. A conchological iconography: a taxonomic introduction of the recent Volutidae. Hackenheim-Conchbook, 30 pp, 5 pl
 Bail P. & Chino M. (2010) The family Volutidae. The endemic Far East Asian subfamily Fulgorariinae Pilsbry & Olsson, 1954: A revision of the Recent species. A conchological iconography (G.T. Poppe & K. Groh, eds). Hackenheim: Conchbooks

External links
 

Volutidae